Duncan Dawkins is a male former weightlifter who competed for England.

Weightlifting career
Dawkins represented England and won a silver medal in the 100 kg sub-heavyweight division, at the 1986 Commonwealth Games in Edinburgh, Scotland. Four years later he represented England and won three gold medals in the 90 kg middle-heavyweight division, at the 1990 Commonwealth Games in Auckland, New Zealand. The three medals were won during an unusual period when three medals were awarded in one category (clean and jerk, snatch and combined) which invariably led to the same athlete winning all three of the same colour medal.

References

English male weightlifters
Commonwealth Games medallists in weightlifting
Commonwealth Games gold medallists for England
Commonwealth Games silver medallists for England
Weightlifters at the 1986 Commonwealth Games
Weightlifters at the 1990 Commonwealth Games
20th-century English people
21st-century English people
Medallists at the 1986 Commonwealth Games
Medallists at the 1990 Commonwealth Games